Faye Adams (born Fanny Tuell, May 22, 1923) is an American singer who recorded and performed rhythm and blues and gospel from the late 1940s until the early 1960s.  She had several chart hits in the early 1950s, before retiring from the music business.

Biography

Early years
Adams was born in Newark, New Jersey. Her father was David Tuell, a gospel singer and a key figure in the Church of God in Christ (COGIC).  At the age of five she joined her sisters to sing spirituals, regularly performing on Newark radio shows.

Musical career
Under her married name, Faye Scruggs, she became a regular performer in New York nightclubs in the late 1940s and early 1950s.  While performing in Atlanta, Georgia, she was discovered by the singer Ruth Brown, who won her an audition with the bandleader Joe Morris of Atlantic Records. Having changed Scruggs's name to Faye Adams, Morris recruited her as a singer in 1952, and signed her to Herald Records. Her first release was Morris's song "Shake a Hand", which topped the US Billboard R&B chart for ten weeks in 1953 and reached number 22 on the US pop chart. It sold one million copies and was awarded a gold disc.

According to the Acoustic Music organization, the "first clear evidence of soul music shows up with The "5" Royales, an ex-gospel group that turned to R&B and in Faye Adams, whose "Shake A Hand" becomes an R&B standard".

In 1954, Adams had two more R&B chart toppers with "I'll Be True" (later covered by Bill Haley in 1954 and by a young Jackie DeShannon in 1957) and "It Hurts Me to My Heart". During this period, she left the Morris band and was billed as "Atomic Adams". She appeared in the 1955 film Rhythm & Blues Revue. In 1957 she moved to Imperial Records, but her commercial success diminished. By the late 1950s she was seen as an older recording artist whose time had come and gone, although she continued to record for various small labels until the early 1960s.  Alan Freed called Adams the "little gal with the big voice" and she toured the Rhythm and Blues Show Tours , which also featured The Drifters, The Counts and The Spaniels.

Later life
By 1963 she had retired from the music industry. She remarried in 1968 and, as Fannie Jones, returned to her gospel roots and family life in New Jersey.  In the 1970s, she was credited as co-writer, with her husband Clarence E. Jones, of several gospel and secular songs, and released a single, "Sinner Man", on Savoy Records.

In February 1998, she received an award from the Rhythm and Blues Foundation, and at the time was reported to be living in England.

According to music historian and writer Marv Goldberg, it is possible that she may have died on November 2, 2016, but this has not been confirmed.

Discography

Singles

Award

References

External links
The big voice of Faye Adams at Home.earthlink.net 
Adams biography at Rockabilly.nl

1923 births
Possibly living people
20th-century African-American women singers
21st-century American women singers
21st-century American singers
American expatriates in England
American gospel singers
American rhythm and blues singers
East Coast blues musicians
Herald Records artists
Imperial Records artists
Musicians from Newark, New Jersey